The Rooster Teeth Podcast, formerly known as the Drunk Tank, is a weekly podcast produced by Rooster Teeth. It is hosted by Gus Sorola and features various members of Rooster Teeth's staff each week. It is sometimes advertised as simply The RT Podcast. It was named Best Gaming Podcast by the Podcast Awards in 2012 and 2013.

History 

On December 9, 2008, after temporarily reviving a feature on their website from their previous website, 'drunkgamers.com,' Rooster Teeth released their first audio podcast, The Drunk Tank, available for download through iTunes, Zune Marketplace, and their website. It soon became one of the most popular features of the site, at one point becoming the #1 most downloaded podcast on iTunes, as well as a featured podcast in the iTunes Store. New episodes have regularly been released every Wednesday since April 10, 2009, with occasional special episodes or multiple releases in one week. In 2009 they began uploading podcast themed "let's play" style videos on Rooster Teeth's YouTube channel. They later moved these videos to their own Let's Play channel in 2013. On June 23, 2010, the podcast changed to a .m4a "enhanced" format which allows listeners to use an interactive "link dump" to be able to view more information on the topics of the week's podcast.

On September 28, 2011, Sorola announced The Drunk Tank was to be re-christened The Rooster Teeth Podcast to create a more unified public image for the company. On August 18, 2010, the podcast was officially implemented into the Rooster Teeth website. To celebrate their 100th episode on February 9, 2011, they released their first ever video podcast which featured Gus Sorola, Geoff Ramsey, Burnie Burns, and Griffon Ramsey. On January 18, 2012, the podcast gained its first sponsor, Audible.com. 

Pizza Hut sold an official Rooster Teeth Podcast pizza in 2014 as part of a brand campaign with Fullscreen, which was nominated for a Streamy Award the following year. In 2016 Pizza Hut sponsored multiple episodes of the podcast as part of a partnership with Rooster Teeth, which received multiple nominations at the 9th Annual Shorty Awards.

On September 26, 2016, Sorola unveiled the new set along with the new logo, replacing the one that had been in use since 2011.

A live ticketed event was held for the 500th episode. In July 2020 the podcast was part of Spotify’s Vodcast launch lineup.

A weekly series called Rooster Teeth Animated Adventures features short stories told from the podcast in the form of animation.

A 2014 conversation on the podcast about a hypothetical scenario involving an immortal snail became the source of a recurring meme on social media. Videos discussing the snail on TikTok had amassed over 230 million views by November 2021.

Format 

Since its inception, the podcast has usually featured three or four of the Rooster Teeth staff members as well as the occasional guest such as Zachary Levi or friends or family of the staff members. Currently the main cast members of the podcast are Gus Sorola, Barbara Dunkelman, and Gavin Free. Burnie Burns was a regular host until September 2019, but briefly returned in 2020 before leaving the company that June.

The podcast is largely a comedic commentary on the popular culture of the week, including video games, recent news, website features, sports, movies, television shows. It is also used to announce the company’s upcoming projects as well as occasionally highlighting fan-made projects.

References

External links 

 

Comedy and humor podcasts
Video podcasts
Video game podcasts
Rooster Teeth
Audio podcasts
2008 podcast debuts
American podcasts